Abdul Kader Kardaghli (born January 1, 1961) is a Syrian former football midfielder who played for Syria in the 1984 Asian Cup in Singapore and 1988 Asian Cup in Qatar. He was popularly dubbed, "Malik" (translated to King).

Personal life
His brother, Ahmad, is also a football player.

Honours

Personal
 Best scorer of the Syrian League 1984 with Tishreen SC
 Best player of the 1988 Arab Nations Cup in Jordan
 Best Syrian player of the century

With clubs
 Syrian League Champion in 1982 with Tishreen SC and 1985, 1986 with Al-Jaish SC
 Syrian Cup winner in 1986 with Al-Jaish SC
 Syrian League runner-up in 1988 and 1994 with Tishreen SC
 Syrian Cup runner-up in 1988 with Tishreen SC

With the Syrian national team
 Gold medal in the 1987 Mediterranean Games in Lattakia
 1988 Arab Nations Cup runner-up in Jordan

External links
Stats

11v11 Profile

Living people
Syrian footballers
Syria international footballers
1961 births
Tishreen SC players
Al-Jaish Damascus players
Competitors at the 1987 Mediterranean Games
Mediterranean Games gold medalists for Syria
1984 AFC Asian Cup players
1988 AFC Asian Cup players
Association football midfielders
Mediterranean Games medalists in football
Syrian Premier League players